Oktyabrsky is an urban locality (a work settlement) and the administrative center of Oktyabrsky District of Perm Krai, Russia. Population:

References

Urban-type settlements in Perm Krai
Oktyabrsky District, Perm Krai